Olga Alekseyevna Govortsova ( (Volha Alyakseyeuna Havartsova); ; born 23 August 1988) is a Belarusian professional tennis player. On 23 June 2008, she achieved a career-high singles ranking of world No. 35. On 29 August 2011, she peaked at No. 24 in the doubles rankings.

Tennis career
She reached her first WTA Tour final at the 2008 Memphis Championships but lost in straight sets to Lindsay Davenport.

Govortsova is sponsored by Wilson and Chinese clothing company Peak. She is represented by French-based sports agency Lagardère Unlimited.

2009
She began her season at the Brisbane International, where she defeated eighth seed Francesca Schiavone en route to the quarterfinals. However, she fell against world No. 41, Sara Errani.
At the Australian Open, she received main-draw entry but lost in straight sets against 20th seed Amélie Mauresmo in the first round.

She then played in Indian Wells, a Premier-Mandatory event where she defeated British Anne Keothavong in the first round before falling to Peng Shuai.
In Miami, at the second Premier-Mandatory event, she lost in the first round to Belarusian qualifier Anastasiya Yakimova.

In October, she reached the final of the Kremlin Cup, losing to Francesca Schiavone.

2010

Govortsova started the new year at the Brisbane International where she lost in the first round to Barbora Záhlavová-Strýcová. At the Sydney International she lost in the first qualifying round to Chanelle Scheepers.

At the Australian Open, she lost in the first round to Angelique Kerber.

At Amelia Island, she beat second seed Alona Bondarenko in the first round, and in the second round Anna Tatishvili, and in the quarterfinals Varvara Lepchenko, and in the semifinals third seed Dominika Cibulková, before losing her third WTA Tour singles final to Caroline Wozniacki.

2015
At the Internationaux de Strasbourg, Govortsova retired in the first round when she played against Mirjana Lučić-Baroni. She failed to qualify for the French Open, losing in three sets to Alexa Glatch.

At Wimbledon, Govortsova advanced to the fourth round of a Grand Slam tournament for the first time, by defeating opponents such as Alizé Cornet (who had beaten Serena Williams the previous year) and Magdaléna Rybáriková in the early rounds. She eventually lost to Madison Keys.

At the Rogers Cup, Govortsova qualified for the main draw and defeated Irina-Camelia Begu in her opening match, before losing to fifth seed Ana Ivanovic in straight sets.

Performance timelines

Only main-draw results of WTA Tour, Grand Slam tournaments and Olympic Games are included in win–loss records.

Singles
Current through the 2022 Australian Open.

Doubles
Current after the season of 2021.

Significant finals

Premier Mandatory/Premier 5 tournaments

Doubles: 2 (1 title, 1 runner-up)

WTA career finals

Singles: 4 (4 runner-ups)

Doubles: 14 (8 titles, 6 runner-ups)

WTA 125 tournament finals

Singles: 1 (runner-up)

Doubles: 1 (title)

ITF Circuit finals

Singles: 16 (9 titles, 7 runner–ups)

Doubles: 9 (3 titles, 6 runner–ups)

Head-to-head records
Govortsova's match record against players who have been ranked world No. 10 or better is as follows:

 Lindsay Davenport 0–1
 Venus Williams 0–2
 Serena Williams 0–1
 Amélie Mauresmo 0–1
 Maria Sharapova 0–1
 Ana Ivanovic 0–3
 Jelena Janković 0–1
 Caroline Wozniacki 0–1
 Victoria Azarenka 1–1
 Svetlana Kuznetsova 0–1
 Petra Kvitová 0–2
 Agnieszka Radwańska 1–3
 Li Na 0–4
 Simona Halep 0–3
 Elina Svitolina 0–1
 Nadia Petrova 0–2
 Elena Dementieva 0–3
 Jelena Dokic 0–1
 Francesca Schiavone 4–2
 Samantha Stosur 1–0
 Daniela Hantuchová 1–4
 Anna Chakvetadze 0–1
 Angelique Kerber 1–5
 Sara Errani 0–2
 Eugenie Bouchard 0–2
 Lucie Šafářová 0–2
 Patty Schnyder 0–1
 Nicole Vaidišová 1–0
 Marion Bartoli 1–3
 Karolína Plíšková 1–0
 Ai Sugiyama 1–1
 Ekaterina Makarova 2–0
 Carla Suárez Navarro 2–2
 Andrea Petkovic 1–2
 Flavia Pennetta 0–3
 Maria Kirilenko 0–1
 Dominika Cibulková 1–0

World TeamTennis
Govortsova has played three seasons with World TeamTennis, making her debut in 2013 with the Sacramento Capitals. She has since played for the Springfield Lasers in 2014 and 2019 was announced to be joining the Lasers again during the 2020 WTT season set to begin July 12.

Notes

References

External links

 
 
 

1988 births
Living people
Sportspeople from Pinsk
Belarusian female tennis players
Olympic tennis players of Belarus
Tennis players at the 2008 Summer Olympics
Wimbledon junior champions
Grand Slam (tennis) champions in girls' doubles
21st-century Belarusian women